Athletics in Italy is the 7th most popular participation sport, practiced by 995,000 people.

Affiliations
The governing body of Athletics in Italy is Federazione Italiana di Atletica Leggera affiliated to European federation, the European Athletic Association (EAA), international federation, the International Association of Athletics Federations (IAAF) and Italian National Olympic Committee (CONI), which in turn is a member of International Olympic Committee (IOC).

All-time top lists
The lists are updated to 12 August 2020, and regards to the 21 individuals Olympic specialities. For high jump, pole vault, long jump, triple jump and shot put performance also affects indoor competitions, measures are identified by (i) in the tables.

100 metres

Men

Women

200 metres

Men

Women

400 metres

Men

Women

800 metres

Men

Women

1500 metres

Men

Women

3000 metres

Men

Women

5000 metres

Men

Women

10,000 metres

Men

Women

110/100 metres hurdles

Men

Women

400 metres hurdles

Men

Women

3000 metres steeplechase

Men

Women

Half marathon

Men

Women

Marathon

Men

Women

20 km walk

Men

Women

50 km walk

Men

Women

High jump

Men

Women

Pole vault

Men

Women

Long jump

Men

Women

Triple jump

Men

Women

Shot put

 
Men

Women

Discus throw

Men

Women

Hammer throw

Men

Women

Javelin throw

Men

Women

Decathlon/Heptathlon

Men

Women

4 × 100 metres relay

Men

Women

4 × 400 metres relay

Men

Women

Mixed
The Italian Federation decided that the first National record of the mixed relay should be quicker than 3:16s. So the best performance of 3:16.12 by Italian team of Davide Re (M), Giancarla Trevisan (W), Andrew Howe (M), Raphaela Lukudo (W)  (3h3) at World Athletics Relays, International, in Yokohama (JPN), on 11 May 2019 was not considered as a NR. The first recognized national record is the following:

See also

Federazione Italiana di Atletica Leggera
Italy national athletics team
Naturalized athletes of Italy
Italian records in athletics
Italian Athletics Championships

References

External links
 Italian Athletics Federation official site
 TOP TEN ALL-TIME – MEN (update 4 July 2018)
 TOP TEN ALL-TIME – WOMEN (update 5 July 2018)

 
Italy
Athletics
Italy